Rocco Costantino (born 8 May 1990) is an Italian footballer who plays as forward for the Italian club Monterosi.

Career 
Costantino made his first match in senior football on 27 August 2017 in a 1–0 win against AlbinoLeffe.

On 28 August 2021, he signed a multi-year contract with Monterosi.

References

External links 

Living people
1990 births
F.C. Südtirol players
U.S. Triestina Calcio 1918 players
Modena F.C. players
S.S.C. Bari players
F.C. Pro Vercelli 1892 players
Monterosi Tuscia F.C. players
People from Aarau
Italian footballers
Serie C players
Association football forwards